Sheosagar, also spelled Shiusagar or Shivsagar, is a village and corresponding community development block in Rohtas district of Bihar, India. As of 2011, the village of Sheosagar had a population of 2,065, in 345 households, while the entire block had a population of 176,080. The nearest major city is Sasaram, the capital of Rohtas district.

Geography 
Located in the western part of Rohtas district, Sheosagar block is geographically diverse, encompassing both parts of the Sasaram plain and areas of the Rohtas plateau, at the eastern end of the Vindhya Range. The area generally slopes downward toward the northeast.

Demographics 

Sheosagar is an entirely rural block, with no major urban centres. The sex ratio of the block in 2011 was 929, which was slightly higher than the average of 918 in all of Rohtas district. This ratio was more equal among 0- to 6-year-olds, with 953 females for every 1000 males; again, this was a bit higher than the district average of 931 for this age group. Members of scheduled castes made up 22.78% of the block's population (40,118 individuals), a slightly higher proportion than the district average of 20.11%. Members of scheduled tribes constituted 1.11% of the population (1,962 individuals), which was about equal to the district average of 1.12%. The literacy rate of Sheosagar block was 71.79%, which was slightly below the district average of 72.5%. Literacy was substantially higher among males (81.42%) than among females (61.37%); however, the 20.05% gender gap in literacy was slightly less pronounced than the district average of 21.04%.

The village of Sheosagar had a population of 2,065 in 2011, of whom 363 (17.58%) were in the 0–6 age group. The literacy rate of the town was 62.95%, with 1,300 people able to read and write (750 male and 550 female).

Employment 
A majority of Sheosagar block's workforce was employed in agriculture, with 22.33% of the workforce being cultivators who owned or leased their own land and another 52.85% being agricultural labourers who worked someone else's land for wages. A further 4.14% were engaged in household industries, and all other forms of work accounted for the remaining 20.68% of the workforce.

In Sheosagar itself, there was a total workforce of 660 (483 men and 177 women) in 2011, of whom 442 (398 men and 44 women) were main workers and 218 (85 men and 133 women) were marginal workers. Between the two categories combined, there were 51 cultivators, 207 agricultural labourers, 45 household industry workers, and 357 other workers.

Amenities 
Of the 153 inhabited villages in Sheosagar block, 90 had schools, which was 58.82% of them; this was a lower rate than the district average of 70.24%. However, the population served by these schools consisted of 84.23% of the block's population, which was also lower than the Rohtas district average of 91.92%. Only 3 villages had medical facilities, which, at 1.96%, was far below the district average of 22.25%; the population they served was only 3.21% of the district, which was still far below the district average. Both percentages, in fact, were the lowest among all blocks in Rohtas district. All 153 villages had access to clean drinking water. 24 villages had post offices. 117 had telephone services, which at 76.47% was substantially higher than the district average of 47.7%; as much as 87.05% of the block's population had telephone access. 71 villages had transport communications (bus, rail, or navigable waterways). 18 villages had banks, and 16 had agricultural credit societies. 80 villages had permanent pucca roads. 134 villages had access to electricity, which was 87.58% of them, slightly higher than the district average of 82.24%; 94.15% of the block's population lived in villages with access to electricity. However, only 14.43% of block residents had electric lights; most (84.84%) households relied on kerosene for lighting instead.

53.43% of the block's household lived in permanent houses made of pucca materials in 2011, while 31.57% lived in semi-permanent houses and 14.7% lived in temporary houses made of kutcha materials. A large majority of households (90.83%) mainly used hand pumps for drinking water, with 3.47% using mainly tap water and 4.41% using mainly wells. A large majority of households had no toilet in their home, with 80.93% relying on open defecation; 14.4% had toilets connected to septic tanks and 1.45% had toilets connected to sewer systems. 23.5% of households had a kitchen in their home, while 70.26% did not. (The remainder mostly cooked outside the house.) Most households (73.44%) primarily used cowdung cake as fuel for cooking, while another 16.97% used mainly firewood. 53.39% of households had access to banks.

24.99% of households had radios, 17.13% had televisions, 0.52% had computers with internet access, 5.14% had computers with no internet access, 1.66% had landline telephones and 57.63% had cell phones (1.63% had both types of phone), 35.9% had bicycles, 7.71% had motor scooters, motorcycles, or mopeds, 11.84% had automobiles, and 27.76% had none of the aforementioned assets.

On 5 July 2017, Sheosagar block was declared "Open Defecation Free", with toilets installed in 16,232 households during the ODF campaign of the preceding six months. It was the sixth block in Rohtas to achieve this status.

The village of Sheosagar possessed two primary schools and four middle schools. It had one medical centre. It did not have well or tap water; water in the village was supplied by hand pump. There were no public toilets. There was a post office. Sheosagar was served by landline phone access as well as mobile phone coverage, and it had Internet access. There was bus service and a railway station. Residents had access to automobiles and tractors. The village was connected to national highways as well as state highways. It had pucca roads. There was an agricultural credit society. Sheosagar village possessed a daily mandi, but a weekly haat did not meet here. It had a community centre and a recreation centre with access to sports fields, and there was a public library. 38 hectares were under cultivation, which was all irrigated by canal.

Villages 
The sub-district of Sheosagar contains 153 inhabited villages and 46 uninhabited ones, for a total of 199 villages:

References

External links 
 Map of the village of Sheosagar

Cities and towns in Rohtas district